Andrey Falinski Rodrigues (born 18 March 1996), commonly known as Andrey, is a Brazilian footballer who currently plays as a midfielder for Betim Futebol.

Career statistics

Club

Notes

References

1996 births
Living people
Brazilian footballers
Brazilian expatriate footballers
Association football midfielders
Cruzeiro Esporte Clube players
Esporte Clube Democrata players
Tupi Football Club players
Clube do Remo players
NK Rudeš players
Ipatinga Futebol Clube players
Campeonato Brasileiro Série C players
Croatian Football League players
Brazilian expatriate sportspeople in Croatia
Expatriate footballers in Croatia
People from Dourados
Sportspeople from Mato Grosso do Sul
Pouso Alegre Futebol Clube players